Knights of the Range is a 1940 American Western film directed by Lesley Selander and written by Norman Houston. The film stars Russell Hayden, Victor Jory, Jean Parker, Morris Ankrum, Britt Wood and J. Farrell MacDonald. The film was released on February 23, 1940, by Paramount Pictures.

Plot

Cast       
Russell Hayden as Renn Frayne
Victor Jory as Malcolm Lascalles
Jean Parker as Holly Ripple
Morris Ankrum as Gamecock
Britt Wood as Laigs 
J. Farrell MacDonald as Cappy
Ethel Wales as Aunt Myra Ripple
Rad Robinson as Brazos Keene 
Ray Bennett as Henchman Heaver 
The King's Men as Singing Cowhands

See also
The Light of Western Stars (1940)

References

External links
 

1940 films
1940s English-language films
American Western (genre) films
1940 Western (genre) films
Paramount Pictures films
Films directed by Lesley Selander
American black-and-white films
1940s American films